Kwara State College of Arabic and Islamic Legal Studies Ilorin,  was established by the Kwara State Government through an act in 1992.  The college is one of 4 that are affiliated to the Bayero University  in Kano, Nigeria.

Kwara State College of Arabic and Islamic legal studies was established by the state's Muslim community to provide the college and other similar institutions with a place to acquire arts and Islamic education.

On September 7, 2020, The National Board for Technical Education (NBTE) approved the college to begin National Diploma (ND) programme.

References

Public universities in Nigeria
Education in Kwara State
Ilorin
Bayero University Kano
Islamic universities and colleges in Nigeria
Educational institutions established in 1992
1992 establishments in Nigeria